This article lists the results for the China women's national football team between 2010 and 2019.

2010

2011

2012

2013

2014

2015

2016

2017

2018

2019

References

2010–2019
2010s in Chinese football